"Floradora", also called Keyword, was a doubly enciphered diplomatic code used by the Germans during the Second World War.  The Allies used  tabulating equipment, created by IBM, to break the code over period of more than a year in 1941 and 1942.

References
 Budiansky, Stephen. Battle of wits: the complete story of codebreaking in World War II, p. 55. Simon and Schuster, 2000
 How the Allies broke the German Diplomatic cipher Floradora. Michael J. Cowan

Cryptography
Communications in Germany